While London Sleeps is a 1926 Warner Bros. film about a police-dog, Rinty, who helps Scotland Yard defeat a dangerous criminal organisation known as the Mediterranean Brotherhood that operates out of the Limehouse district of London. Walter Morosco wrote the screenplay. It was the first of many films directed by Howard Bretherton, and one of several created for Rin Tin Tin, a German Shepherd dog used in films during the 1920s and 1930s. The film was also released with a Vitaphone sound-on-disc soundtrack with a music score and sound effects, and only the sound discs survive today. The British release prints censored the more horrific aspects of the film.

George Kotsonaros only appeared in two horror films, this one and The Wizard (1927), and he played a beast-man in both movies. He died in a car accident in Alabama in 1933.

Plot
Inspector Burke of Scotland Yard concentrates all his forces on the capture of London Letter, a notorious criminal leader in the Limehouse district who possesses both Rinty, a splendid dog, and a man-beast monster called The Monk who ravages and kills at his master's command. Burke almost apprehends the gang in the midst of an attempted theft, but Rinty's uncanny perceptions foil Burke's coup, and Foster is killed for betraying the gang. When Rinty loses in a fight against another dog, Burke's daughter, Dale, rescues Rinty from London Letter's abuse, and he becomes devoted to his new mistress. At the criminal's order, the monster kidnaps Dale and imprisons her. Burke and his men wound London Letter while on his trail, and Rinty finds him dying. In a ferocious battle, Rinty kills the monster by tearing out his throat.

Cast
Rin Tin Tin as Rinty
Helene Costello as Dale Burke
Walter Merrill as Thomas Hallard
John Patrick as Foster
Otto Matieson as London Letter
George Kotsonaros as The Monk
De Witt Jennings as Inspector Burke
Carl Stockdale as Stokes
Les Bates as Long Tom

Box office
According to Warner Bros records the film earned $235,000 domestically and $97,000 foreign.

Preservation status
No prints of this film are known to survive suggesting it is lost. It is on the Lost Film Files list for missing Warner Bros., but the soundtrack survives intact on Vitaphone disks in the UCLA Film and Television Archive.

See also
List of early Warner Bros. sound and talking features

References

External links

1926 films
American silent feature films
1926 crime films
American black-and-white films
Films about dogs
Warner Bros. films
Lost American films
American serial killer films
Films directed by Howard Bretherton
Films set in London
American crime films
Rin Tin Tin
1926 lost films
Early sound films
1920s American films